UDai Lal Kumhar (1949–2007) a famous work man on terracotta was an award winner personality from Rajasthan he lived in a small village near Udaipur. He won the Rajasthan State Award for Master Craftsmen 1985-1986 for terracotta.

References

1949 births
2007 deaths
Indian male sculptors
20th-century Indian sculptors
20th-century Indian male artists